Kingsley Obiekwe Sam (born 25 March 1994) is a Spanish-born Equatoguinean professional basketball player who plays for Italian club Herons Basket and the Equatorial Guinea national team.

Early life
Obiekwe was born in Madrid to a Nigerian father and an Equatorial Guinean mother. As a young player, he developed at Torrejón Basketball Academy in the outskirts of the Spanish capital, and had success for their Junior teams.

Professional career
Obiekwe has played in the United States for the Northeastern Oklahoma A&M Golden Norsemen. Later, he played back in Spain for Fundación Lucentum Baloncesto.

International career
Obiekwe has joined the Equatorial Guinea men's national basketball team in January 2020.

References

External links
 Kingsley Obiekwe - Video highlights
 Hudl Videos - Video highlights

1994 births
Living people
CB Lucentum Alicante players
Citizens of Equatorial Guinea through descent
Equatoguinean expatriate sportspeople in Italy
Equatoguinean expatriate sportspeople in the United States
Equatoguinean men's basketball players
Equatoguinean people of Nigerian descent
Sportspeople of Nigerian descent
Northeastern Oklahoma A&M Golden Norsemen basketball players
People of Igbo descent
Shooting guards
Small forwards
Spanish expatriate basketball people in Italy
Spanish expatriate basketball people in the United States
Spanish men's basketball players
Basketball players from Madrid
Spanish sportspeople of Equatoguinean descent
Spanish sportspeople of African descent
Spanish people of Nigerian descent